Federico Garcín (born 14 November 1973) is an Uruguayan former basketball player.

References

1973 births
Living people
Basketball players at the 1995 Pan American Games
Pan American Games competitors for Uruguay
Uruguayan men's basketball players
Place of birth missing (living people)
20th-century Uruguayan people